Irma Amelia de Malkhozouny (formerly Irma Osborne, Duchess of Leeds) was an Italian-born Serbian ballet dancer. She was Duchess of Leeds from 1933 until 1948, during her marriage to John Osborne, 11th Duke of Leeds.

Biography 
Irma Amelia de Malkhozouny was the daughter of Iskender de Malkhozouny. She was a professional ballet dancer. She married Paul Brewster, but later divorced. On 27 March 1933 she married John Osborne, 11th Duke of Leeds in Nice, France. Her husband was the son of George Osborne, 10th Duke of Leeds and Lady Katherine Lambton. The marriage produced no children, and ended in 1948 when de Malkhozouny had an affair with Frank Atherton Howard, an American millionaire. In 1947 she married Howard. The duke went on to marry two other times, to Audrey Young and Caroline Fleur Vatcher.

She was photographed by Norman Parkinson.

References 

Serbian ballerinas
Leeds
Irma